Bruce W. Pepich (born 1952, Elmhurst, Illinois) is an expert in American and international craft, and executive director and curator of collections at the Racine Art Museum (RAM) and Charles A. Wustum Museum of Fine Arts (Wustum) in Racine, Wisconsin. In Pepich's time at RAM, the contemporary craft collection has increased in size from 253 pieces to almost 10,000 pieces in 2018, one of the largest collections in the United States. Pepich is an Honorary Fellow of the American Craft Council (ACC), in recognition of his contributions to the field of contemporary American crafts.

Biography
Pepich was raised in the western Chicago suburbs.  He was introduced to the Art Institute of Chicago as a pre-teen and visited frequently.  Pepich received a BA in Art History with a concentration in contemporary art, from Northern Illinois University, DeKalb, Illinois, in 1974.

Pepich joined RAM as a project director after graduation and was appointed director in 1980. During his tenure, he has built RAM into a major museum focusing on contemporary crafts and fulfilling his, "longstanding ambition to direct the most important craft museum in the Midwest." The museum's most significant donor and promoter, Karen Johnson Boyd, played a significant role, working with Pepich in gaining national recognition for its collection and raising more than ten million dollars for the new building in downtown Racine, creating two campuses for art and education.  The National Endowment for the Arts (NEA) also supports Pepich in his philosophy that "serving the community is good for us as an institution."

Pepich has participated on over 135 jury panels for regional, national, and international competitive art exhibitions and fellowship programs.  These include the Cotsen Prize for Japanese Bamboo Basketry, the Louis Comfort Tiffany Foundation Artists’ Grants, and the Philadelphia Museum of Art Craft Show, described as being "juried by the most distinguished experts in the various fields of craft art".

Recognition
 2010, Ann Koski Professional Excellence Award-Wisconsin Federation of Museums
 2010, State of Wisconsin Governor's Award in the Arts from the Wisconsin Foundation for the Arts and Governor Jim Doyle of the State of Wisconsin
 2011, Wisconsin Visual Art Achievement Award-Museum of Wisconsin Art
 2012, Honorary Fellow in the American Craft Council's College of Fellows

Board appointments
 1991 - 1997	Board of Directors, Taylor Children's Home, Racine, Wisconsin
 1992		National Endowment for the Arts, Advancement Program Overview Panel
 1992 - 1996	Fine Arts Advisory Committee, Carthage College, Kenosha, Wisconsin
 1993 - 1996	Professional Advisory Committee, Friends of Fiber International
 1994 - 1996	Board of Trustees, Creative Glass Center of America, Millville, New Jersey
 2007 - 2010	Board of Directors, Cultural Alliance of Greater Milwaukee, Wisconsin
 2013 – Present	Board of Trustees, American Craft Council

Personal life
Pepich lives with his wife, Lisa Englander, an artist and curator, in Racine, Wisconsin

Publications

Essay in 
Essay in 

Preface to

References 

Date of birth missing (living people)
Living people
American art curators
1952 births
People from Elmhurst, Illinois
Northern Illinois University alumni
People from Racine, Wisconsin